Jack Francis "Blackjack" Vanbebber (July 27, 1907 – April 13, 1986) was an American wrestler and Olympic gold medalist at the 1932 Olympic Games in freestyle wrestling.

Vanbebber was born and raised in Perry, Oklahoma. He attended and wrestled at Oklahoma A&M University and was a three-time NCAA national champion. He was coached by Edward C. Gallagher. He competed at the 1932 Olympic Games in Los Angeles, where he received a gold medal in the freestyle welterweight division.

He was severely injured in a wagon accident as a child, but his attitude and perseverance carried him through his injuries. Before his death, he was named one of the ten greatest amateur athletes in the western hemisphere for the first half of the 20th century. He once wrestled Frank Phillips (founder of Phillips 66) at his home in Bartlesville, Oklahoma. In 1976, he was inducted into the inaugural class of the National Wrestling Hall of Fame as a Distinguished Member.

Further reading
 A Distant Flame: The Inspiring Story of Jack VanBebber's Quest for a World Olympic Title, tells more about his life.

References

1907 births
1986 deaths
People from Perry, Oklahoma
Wrestlers at the 1932 Summer Olympics
American male sport wrestlers
Olympic gold medalists for the United States in wrestling
Oklahoma State Cowboys wrestlers
Medalists at the 1932 Summer Olympics